McClymonds Educational Complex was the collective name of the two small high schools occupying the building of McClymonds High School, operated by the Oakland Unified School District from August 2005 to 2010.

As of 2010, the complex has returned to being a single high school, McClymonds High School.

History

McClymonds High School was established in 1915. After 90 years, on August 29, 2005, it was divided into three smaller schools: EXCEL High School (Experience, eXcellence, Community, Empowerment, and Leadership), BEST High School (Business Entrepreneurial School of Technology), and Kizmet Academy (slogan: "Students Destined for Greatness"), a middle school.

EXCEL and BEST each served about 300-400 high school students in the 2005-06 school year, while Kizmet Academy served approximately 150 middle school students. In the 2007-08 year, a total of 508 students were enrolled, with 221 in BEST and 287 in EXCEL.

In the 2007-08 year, Kizmet Academy was discontinued.  EXCEL and BEST remained in operation until 2010, when McClymonds Educational Complex returned to being McClymonds High School.

There was an adult school located on the campus as well.

EXCEL High School

EXCEL High School was focused on preparing its students for postsecondary education.  Through its SMArt (Storytelling, Media, and Art) Academy, EXCEL offered video production.  Its Law and Government Academy competed in Mock Trial with other high schools such as Piedmont High School.  EXCEL also offered AVID classes.

EXCEL High School created Akanke, a chapter of Daughters of Queens Sorority, Inc., the first high school sorority in Northern California.

As of 2006, EXCEL possessed an API score of 568, a statewide rank of 1, and a similar schools rank of 6.

BEST High School

BEST was a college preparatory high school with an entrepreneurship emphasis. The expectation that every student would achieve educational excellence with academic support was inherent in the school's philosophy. Small classes and close interaction with experienced and dedicated faculty were a hallmark of education at BEST.  The teacher-to-student ratio was about 1:25.

BEST, through its Culinary Arts Academy, offered cooking and food science, and through its ACE Academy, it offered wood shop and business management. BEST offered business classes, with the NFTE curriculum, in which students were able to complete business plans and compete for scholarships.

As of 2006, BEST possessed an API score of 486, a statewide rank of 1, and a similar schools rank of 2.

References

External links
BEST High School information
EXCEL High School information
San Francisco Chronicle news article regarding small schools
Mentions college preparatory nature of BEST and EXCEL

Educational institutions established in 2005
High schools in Oakland, California
Public high schools in California
Small schools movement
2005 establishments in California